La Grange Highlands is an unincorporated community south of La Grange in Cook County, Illinois, United States. Located near I-294 and I-55, the town is bordered by Countryside, Indian Head Park, La Grange, and Western Springs. It primarily contains residential properties, with very few businesses within its boundaries.  Despite being unincorporated it contains a fire department that serves itself and neighboring communities.  LaGrange Highlands School District 106 serves students K-12, and Lyons Township High School is the public high school.

References

Chicago metropolitan area
Unincorporated communities in Cook County, Illinois
Unincorporated communities in Illinois